Ir Ganim (Hebrew: עיר גנים, "city of gardens") is a neighborhood in southwest Jerusalem, bordering Kiryat Menachem.

History
Planning for Ir Ganim began in 1953. It was designed for a population of 8,000-10,000 new immigrants on 1,577 dunams of land. The first 500 housing units were built by the Rassco company employing a higher standard of building than other new immigrant neighborhoods. Each home had a private garden. Ir Ganim Aleph  was established in 1957. Before moving to Ir Ganim, most of the residents had been living in maabarot (transit camps).  Some of the land was  owned by the Jewish National Fund and the rest was provided by the Israel Lands Administration.

Demographics
The population of Ir Ganim neighborhood is diverse, including both native Israelis and immigrants from Ethiopia and Russia.  It is considered a poor neighborhood, but has wealthier sections, such as Ir Ganim Aleph, overlooking the Judean Mountains. Kibbutz Reisheet, an urban kibbutz, is located in Ir Ganim.

Sections and streets
The neighborhood is divided into three sections: Ir Ganim Aleph, between Mexico Road and Halamit Road, west of the valley that separates it from Kiryat Hayovel.  Ir Ganim Bet lies between Panama, Dahomey, Halamit and Avivit Roads; and Ir Ganim Gimmel is bordered by Costa Rica Road. Many of the streets are named for countries in Latin America that voted in favor of the  establishment of the State of Israel in 1948. Others are named for wildflowers.

Public institutions
Ir Ganim has its own library and shares a community center {) with Kiryat Menachem.

Nahal Lavan
The Lavan Valley is situated between Ir Ganim and Givat Massuah to the east and Moshav Ora to the west. The valley contains the riverhead of Nahal Sifan, the Second Temple period site of Ha-Rogem,  olive presses, water cisterns and watch towers, and the ruins of an ancient settlement near Ein Lavan Spring.

References

External links
Rogem Ganim Project in Community Archaeology

Neighbourhoods of Jerusalem